Hyginus Gromaticus (Gromaticus from groma, a surveying device) was a Latin writer on land-surveying, who flourished in the reign of Trajan (AD 98–117). Fragments of a work on boundaries attributed to him are found in Corpus Agrimensorum Romanorum, a collection of works on land surveying compiled in Late Antiquity. The 'surname' Gromaticus ("surveyor") is a false attribution.

Origin of the epithet "Gromaticus" 
Hyginus Gromaticus (Gromaticus, meaning "surveyor," derives from groma, a measuring instrument used by ancient Roman surveyors) is known only from his work De Constitutione Limitum (On the Establishment of Boundaries) in the Corpus Agrimensorum Romanorum, a collection of works on land surveying compiled in Late Antiquity. He probably lived between the end of the first century AD and the reign of the Emperor Trajan. His epithet "Gromaticus" is a false reading which goes back to the oldest manuscript, the Codex Arcerianus, in which the subscript of the text reads exp(licit) Kygini gromatici constitutio feliciter ("The Establishment of Kyginus the surveyor explains well"). Other manuscripts, like the Palatinus Vatic. lat. 1564, have explicit liber Hygini gromaticvs ("The Book of Hyginus on Surveying explains..."), where the adjective gromaticvs clearly describes the book not the author. For this reason, in the most recent edition, Brian Campbell avoids the name and calls the author "Hyginus 1" (to distinguish him from "Hyginus 2", another author in the Corpus Agrimensorum).

Works 
Hyginus' De Constitutio [limitum] is preserved only in a corrupt text. However, the contents include important evidence on the Latin reception of Greek astronomical and mathematical texts, since in his discussion of the construction of the decumanus and cardo (the east-west and north-south streets that formed the centre of a town's grid plan), Hyginus is decidedly in favour of the construction of the decumanus using a gnomon (sundial) and compares this method with other less precise methods such as using the location of sunrise and sunset. The text has some connection with a passage included in Bubnov's Geometria incerti auctori (Geometric works of unknown authors). Editions of the work appear in C. F. Lachmann, Gromatici Veteres, i (1848), Carl Olof Thulin, Corpus agrimensorum Romanorum, I Opuscula agrimensorum veterum (Leipzig, 1913). and Brian Campbell. The writings of the Roman land surveyors (2000), with an English translation. 

Another work by Hyginus, Liber gromaticus de divisionibus agrorum ("Surveying Book on the Division of Fields") is transmitted only as a title and might be the same as De Constitutio.

A treatise on Roman military camps (De Munitionibus Castrorum), was formerly attributed to him, but is probably of later date, about the 3rd century AD (ed. W. Gemoll, 1879; A. von Domaszewski, 1887) and is now attributed to "Pseudo-Hyginus".

References

Bibliography
'
 F. Blume, K. Lachmann, K. Rudorff (ed.): Gromatici veteres. Die Schriften der römischen Feldmesser. 2 Volumes. Berlin 1848–52, pp. 166–208. (online)
 N. Bubnov: Gerberti postea Silvestri II papae Opera mathematica (972-1003). Berlin 1899. (Reprint: Hildesheim 2005). (online)
 B. Campbell. The writings of the Roman land surveyors. Introduction, translation and commentary (= Journal of the Roman Studies Monographs. 9). London 2000.
 M. Clavel-Lévêque, D. Conso, A. Gonzales, J.-Y. Guillaumin et al. Corpus Agrimensorum Romanorum V. Hygin, L'Œuvre gromatique. Luxembourg 2000. (online) 
 J.-Y. Guillaumin. Les arpenteurs romains. Tome 1: Hygin le Gromatique, Frontin. (= Les belles Lettres 1, Collection des universités de France Série latine). Paris 2005. 
 J-O. Lindermann, E. Knobloch, C. Möller.  Hyginus – Das Feldmesserbuch. Ein Meisterwerk der spätantiken Buchkunst. Herausgegeben, übersetzt und mit Kommentaren versehen, Darmstadt 2018. 

1st-century Romans
2nd-century Romans
1st-century Latin writers
2nd-century Latin writers
Ancient Roman writers
Silver Age Latin writers
Ancient Roman surveyors
Ancient mathematicians